Roarke Smith (born 11 September 1996) is a professional Australian rules footballer playing for the Western Bulldogs in the Australian Football League (AFL). Smith was drafted with the fifth selection in the 2015 rookie draft. He made his AFL debut late in the 2015 season against . Just one week after his debut, he suffered an Anterior cruciate ligament injury which left him injured until July 2016. He played in the Bulldogs' 2016 premiership team. In March 2017, he again ruptured his ACL. He was delisted by the Western Bulldogs at the conclusion of the 2017 season. He was later re-drafted by the Western Bulldogs in the 2018 rookie draft. He was involved in a car crash in 2018 which saw him miss one game. After having a breakout 2021 season, playing 14 games (4 being finals), he signed on with the Bulldogs on the main list.

Statistics
 Statistics are correct to the end of the 2021 season

|- style="background-color: #EAEAEA"
! scope="row" style="text-align:center" | 2015
|
| 37 || 1 || — || — || 3 || 6 || 9 || 3 || 1 || 0.0 || 0.0 || 3.0 || 6.0 || 9.0 || 3.0 || 1.0
|-
! scope="row" style="text-align:center" | 2016
|
| 37 || 1 || — || — || 8 || 4 || 12 || 5 || 1 || — || — || 8.0 || 4.0 || 12.0 || 5.0 || 1.0
|- style="background-color: #EAEAEA"
! scope="row" style="text-align:center" | 2017
|
| 37 || — || — || — || — || — || — || — || — || — || — || — || — || — || — || —
|-
! scope="row" style="text-align:center" | 2018
|
| 37 || 10 || —  || 1 || 50 || 70 || 120 || 20 || 14 || —  || 0.1 || 5.0 || 7.0 || 12.0 || 2.0 || 1.4
|- style="background-color: #EAEAEA"
! scope="row" style="text-align:center" | 2019
|
| 37 || 5 || 4 || 1 || 35 || 24 || 59 || 13 || 12 || 0.8 || 0.2 || 7.0 || 4.8 || 11.8 || 2.6 || 2.4
|-
! scope="row" style="text-align:center" | 2020
|
| 37 || 6 || 2 || 1 || 29 || 41 || 70 || 12 || 8 || 0.3 || 0.2 || 4.8 || 6.8 || 11.7 || 2 || 1.3
|- 
! scope="row" style="text-align:center" | 2021
|
| 37 || 14 || 3 || 4 || 79 || 88 || 167 || 28 || 34 || 0.2 || 0.3 || 5.6 || 6.3 || 11.9 || 2.1 || 2.4
|-class="sortbottom"
! colspan=3| Career
! 37
! 9
! 7
! 204
! 233
! 437
! 82
! 70
! 0.2
! 0.2
! 5.5
! 6.3
! 11.8
! 2.2
! 1.9
|}

Notes

References

External links

1996 births
Living people
Western Bulldogs players
Australian rules footballers from South Australia
Calder Cannons players